Thijs Libregts (born 4 January 1941) is a Dutch football coach and former player, who played professionally as a defender in the 1950s. His daughter Patricia was one of the Netherlands' leading water polo players in the 1980s and 1990s.

Club career
Born in Rotterdam, Libregts began his playing career at Excelsior Rotterdam, where he played from 1958 to 1962. From Excelsior he moved to Rotterdam's larger team Feyenoord, where he remained until 1968. After six years at Feyenoord, Libregts returned to Excelsior where he played until 1972 when he announced his retirement.

Managerial career
Libregts' first coaching position was at Excelsior Rotterdam, where he worked from 1975 to 1980. Excelsior were relegated in Libregts' first season, but they won promotion in 1978–79. From Excelsior he moved to PSV Eindhoven, whom he took to second place in the Eredivisie in 1981–82. In 1983 Libregts moved to Feyenoord, where he won a league and cup double in his first season. At Feyenoord Libregts he was involved in a race row after he was alleged to have referred to Ruud Gullit as "blackie" and criticised him for being lazy, though Libregts defended himself by claiming that it was merely a nickname.

In November 1984 Libregts moved to Greece with Aris Thessaloniki, where he remained until 1986. In the 1986–87 season he joined PAOK, but his stay was brief and in December 1987 he switched to Olympiacos. Libregts was appointed as Netherlands manager in 1988 as he took over from Rinus Michels as coach of the European champions. The Netherlands easily qualified for the 1990 FIFA World Cup, but Libregts was replaced by Leo Beenhakker before the tournament itself.

From 1991 to 1994 he was a coach with Iraklis Thessaloniki in Greece and from 1994 to 1995 returned to coach Olympiacos. Having been dismissed by Olympiakos, Libregts took charge of the Nigeria national team in August 1998, who he managed until October 1999. After two years out of work Libregts joined Grazer AK in October 2001 where he remained until August 2002 and whom he led to the Cup, as well as to the victory in Supercup.

In August 2002 he was replaced by Walter Schachner and he has been without a club since then.

References

External links
 

Living people
1941 births
Association football defenders
Footballers from Rotterdam
Dutch football managers
Dutch expatriate football managers
Dutch footballers
Excelsior Rotterdam players
Feyenoord players
Excelsior Rotterdam managers
PSV Eindhoven managers
Feyenoord managers
Eredivisie players
Eredivisie managers
Netherlands national football team managers
Super League Greece managers
Aris Thessaloniki F.C. managers
Olympiacos F.C. managers
Iraklis Thessaloniki F.C. managers
PAOK FC managers
Grazer AK managers
Expatriate football managers in Greece
Nigeria national football team managers
Expatriate football managers in Nigeria
Dutch expatriate sportspeople in Nigeria